Terence Eugene Bradbury (born 15 November 1939) is an English former professional footballer who played as a wing half.

Playing career
Bradbury began his career with Chelsea, being capped by England Schoolboys on four occasions. He went on to make 29 appearances in the Football League First Division for Chelsea before leaving for Southend United in September 1962, for about £6,000, after falling out with manager Tommy Docherty.

After four years of regular football at Roots Hall, Bradbury switched to Leyton Orient for 1966–67 and then moved to Wrexham in the summer of 1967. Bradbury was sent off on his league debut against Luton Town but went on to establish himself as a favourite with Wrexham fans. In 1969, he joined local rivals Chester, combining his playing duties with working as a coach. After leaving Chester in 1971, Bradbury worked as a player-coach at Weymouth and followed it up with a short-spell as player-manager at Northwich Victoria.

Personal life
Away from football, Bradbury has worked in the licensing trade, being based in Derbyshire. In July 2015 Bradbury won a prize of £5.5m on the National Lottery.

External links

References

1939 births
Living people
Footballers from Paddington
English Football League players
English footballers
Association football wing halves
Chelsea F.C. players
Southend United F.C. players
Leyton Orient F.C. players
Wrexham A.F.C. players
Chester City F.C. players
Weymouth F.C. players
Northwich Victoria F.C. players
Northwich Victoria F.C. managers
English football managers
Chester City F.C. non-playing staff
Lottery winners